This is a list of common household pests – undesired animals that have a history of living, invading, causing damage, eating human foods, acting as disease vectors or causing other harms in human habitation.

Mammals
Mice
Field mice
House mice
Possums
Brushtail possum
Ringtail possum
Rats
Black rats
Brown rats
Wood rats
Cotton rats

Invertebrates
Ants
Argentine ants
Carpenter ants
Fire ants
Odorous house ants
Pharaoh ants
Thief ants
Bed bugs
Beetles
Woodworms
Death watch beetles
Furniture beetles
Weevils
Maize weevil
Rice weevil
Carpet beetles
Fur beetles
Varied carpet beetles
Spider beetles
Mealworm beetles
Centipedes
House centipedes
Cockroaches
Brown-banded cockroaches
German cockroaches
American cockroaches
Oriental cockroaches
Dust mites
Earwigs
Crickets
House crickets
Flies
Bottle flies
Blue bottle flies
Green bottle flies
House flies
Fruit flies
Mosquitoes
Moths
Almond moths
Indianmeal moths
Clothes moths
 Gypsy moths
Common clothes moths
Brown house moths
Paper Lice
Red spiders
Silverfish
Spiders
Termites
Dampwood termites
Subterranean termites
Woodlouse

See also
Home-stored product entomology
List of notifiable diseases
Noxious weed
Pest (organism)

References

Pests (organism)
Nature-related lists